The University of Sarajevo (Bosnian, Croatian and Serbian: Univerzitet u Sarajevu / Sveučilište u Sarajevu / Универзитет у Сарајеву) is a public university located in Sarajevo, Bosnia and Herzegovina. It is the largest and oldest university in the country, tracing its initial origins to 1537 as an Islamic madrasa.

With 20 faculties, three academies and three faculties of theology and with 30,866 enrolled students as of 2014, it ranks among the largest universities in the Balkans in terms of enrollment. Since opening its doors in 1949, a total of 122,000 students received bachelor's degrees, 3,891 received master's degrees and 2,284 received doctorate degrees in 45 different fields. It is now widely regarded as the most prestigious university in Bosnia and Herzegovina, and employs more than one thousand faculty members.

History

Ottoman period, late Medieval-early Modern
Before establishment of modern University of Sarajevo, first schools of higher educations in Sarajevo and Bosnia and Herzegovina were founded during 16th century under tutelage of Ottomans. As Ottoman institute of higher education first Madrasa in Bosnia, namely Gazi Husrev-beg Madrasa & Library, was inaugurated in Sarajevo 1537 by Gazi Husrev-beg.

Austria-Hungary period and first Yugoslavia, late Modern-end of WWII

The university in its modern, secular incarnation being developed during Austro-Hungarian Empire rule, when many of the institutions of higher education and culture such as National Museum of Bosnia and Herzegovina, still active today, were established. The modern history of the University of Sarajevo continued after the World War I, and before World War II as well as during the war, successfully extanding its development with new schools and institutes opened, such as the Faculty of Agriculture and Forestry in 1940, the Medical Faculty in 1944. The Medical Faculty was re-established in 1946, the Faculty of Law, the Teacher Training College were opened and, in 1948, the Faculty of Agriculture and Forestry was re-established.

Establishment and post WWII development

1949–1955
In 1949, the Engineering Faculty was opened. On 2 December of that year with the appointment of the first rector, the University of Sarajevo was officially established. With the opening of the Faculty of Philosophy (1950) and the Faculty of Economics (1952) the initial phase of establishment of the Sarajevo University was completed.

1955–1970
The second phase of development (1955–69) was characterized by the affirmation of the university, the opening of new institutions of higher education and the relative satisfaction of the needs for highly educated personnel in Bosnia and Herzegovina. Another significant achievement is the organization and initiation of postgraduate studies at the university.

1970–1982
The third phase (1970–82) was defined by more institutions of higher education being opened at the university, a scientific promotion of the university and its intensified involvement and promotion on the international academic plane. The university contributed directly and indirectly to the establishment of new universities in Banja Luka, Mostar and Tuzla.

1982–1992
The fourth phase (1982–92) was characterized by the separation of scientific activities from the university and the formation of favored scientific institutes outside it. This brought considerable damage to the University of Sarajevo, because the coherence of university education and scientific research was endangered. This resulted in a lower quality of education and a technological stagnation of the university. The uncontrolled enrollment of an enormous number of students resulted in a significantly lower efficiency of studies and a hyper-production of personnel in certain areas of education.

1992–1995
The fifth phase (1992–95) was marked by devastation of the facilities and equipment of the university, caused by the war in Bosnia and Herzegovina and the Siege of Sarajevo. 
Despite all of these difficulties of life and work during the four-year siege of Sarajevo, because of the help and the enthusiasm, professionalism, patriotism and perseverance of university teachers and associates as well as the students, the University of Sarajevo managed to retain its continuity of work and life. This was a specific aspect of intellectual academic resistance against everything that is barbaric and uncivilized. It represented the university's contribution to the affirmation of freedom and democracy, the outcry against the war and aggression and the affirmation of the sovereignty of Bosnia and Herzegovina.

1996–present
At the beginning of 1996 the University of Sarajevo entered the phase of post-war physical and academic renewal and reconstruction. The physical renewal is aimed at the reconstruction and the rebuilding of destroyed facilities (through the realization of the New University Campus Project), the replacement of destroyed educational and scientific equipment and the reconstruction of student dormitories. Significant results have been achieved on this plane and the conditions for higher quality studies have been formed in certain areas. However, despite the numerous reconstruction projects the University of Sarajevo still hasn't reached the full prewar potential. The quality and number of student dormitories are still far below the required, technology is mostly outdated, and since the working conditions could be much better academic staff is also lacking. In addition, the war caused a rift even among the academics and many who worked at the university before the war didn't continue after. The quality of studies is slowly improving, partly because of the Bologna Process implementation, but there is still hyper-production in some areas of education since the Bosnia and Herzegovina doesn't have a unified program of higher education (one could say that it has as many as 11 programs, each implementing Bologna Accord in its own manner).

The process of renewal and reconstruction of the university is supported by the activities of the European University Association, the European Council, the European Union as well as a whole line of international organizations and institutions involved in the field of higher education.

Partner relations
The University of Sarajevo enjoys partnerships with over 120 universities in Europe, the US, Canada, and the Middle East.

Objective
The main objective of all the university's current activities is to raise the quality of studies, to create a contemporary university of European origins, which will be a respectable representative of Bosnia and Herzegovina on the international level and a promoter of the traditional, historical, cultural, scientific and artistic values of the country, and Southeastern Europe.

Organization

The University comprises 32 faculties, academies and colleges, further subdivided into 6 academic groups, and an additional number of other programs:

Schools
School of Economics and Business Sarajevo
Academy of Fine Arts in Sarajevo
Academy of Performing Arts in Sarajevo
Faculty of Architecture
Faculty of Electrical Engineering
Faculty of Criminal Science
Faculty of Political Science in Sarajevo
Faculty of Sport and Physical Education
Faculty of Traffic Engineering and Communications
Faculty of Pharmacy
Faculty of Philosophy
Faculty of Civil Engineering
Faculty of Mechanical Engineering
Medical Faculty
Sarajevo Music Academy
College of Teacher Education
Faculty of Agriculture
Sarajevo Law School
Faculty of Science and Technology
Faculty of Natural Sciences and Mathematics
Faculty of Dental Medicine
Faculty of Forestry
Faculty of Veterinary Medicine
Faculty of Health Studies

Join Members
Faculty of Islamic Studies
Faculty of Catholic Theology
Faculty of Public Administration

Institutes
Institute of History
Institute for Researching Crimes against Humanity and International Law
Institute for Genetic Engineering and Biotechnology
Oriental Institute
Students Center Sarajevo
Institute for Social Research

Rectors

Vaso Butozan (1949–1950; 1952–1956)
Drago Krndija (1950–1952)
Edhem Čamo (1956–1960)
Aleksandar Trumić (1960–1965)
Fazlija Alikalfić (1965–1969)
Hamdija Ćemerlić (1969–1972)
Zdravko Besarović (1972–1977)
Arif Tanović (1977–1981)
Božidar Matić (1981–1985)
Ljubomir Berberović (1985–1988)
Nenad Kecmanović (1988–1991)
Jusuf Mulić (1991–1993)
Faruk Selesković (1993–1995)
Nedžad Mulabegović (1995–2000)
Boris Tihi (2000–2004)
Hasan Muratović (2004–2006)
Faruk Čaklovica (2006–2012)
Muharem Avdispahić (2012–2016)
Rifat Škrijelj (2016–present)

Notable alumni

Adela Jušić, Bosnian contemporary visual artist
Ademir Kenović, Bosnian movie director, producer and cinematography professor
Aleksandar Hemon, Bosnian writer
Alija Behmen, former mayor of Sarajevo
Alija Izetbegović, first Chairman of the Presidency of Bosnia and Herzegovina
Bakir Izetbegović, former member of the Presidency of Bosnia and Herzegovina
Beriz Belkić, former member of the Presidency of Bosnia and Herzegovina
Boris Nemšić, former Chief Executive Officer of the Russian telecom company VimpelCom, former Chief Executive Officer of Telekom Austria Group
Branko Đurić, Bosnian actor and musician
Dejan Milošević, Bosnian theoretical physicist
Dritan Abazović, Prime Minister of Montenegro
Edvin Kanka Ćudić, Bosnian human rights activist
Heather McRobie, British-Australian writer
Ivica Osim, ex-Head Coach for Yugoslavia national football team and Japan national football team
Jasmila Žbanić, Bosnian film director
Jasmin Geljo, Bosnian actor
Jelena Silajdžić, Bosnian human rights activist
Kornelije Kovač, Serbian composer
MayaSar, Bosnian singer
Mile Akmadžić, former Prime Minister of the Republic of Bosnia and Herzegovina
Miljenko Jergović, Bosnian and Croatian writer
Mirko Šundov, Chief of General Staff of the Croatian Armed Forces
Neda Ukraden, folk singer
Omer Halilhodžić, automotive designer
Predrag Finci, philosopher and essayist
Radovan Karadžić, Bosnian Serb former politician
Radovan Višković, Bosnian Serb politician
Rasim Ljajić, former Deputy Prime Minister of the Republic of Serbia
Rifat Hadžiselimović, genetist
Safet Isović, prominent Bosnian sevdalinka singer
Selmo Cikotić, Bosnian Minister of Defense
Semiha Borovac, former mayor of Sarajevo
Senad Bašić, Bosnian actor
Sulejman Tihić, former member of the Presidency of Bosnia and Herzegovina
Sven Alkalaj, former foreign minister of Bosnia and Herzegovina
Vlado Pravdić, Bosnian organist
Zdravko Čolić, Bosnian pop singer
Željko Komšić, member of the Presidency of Bosnia and Herzegovina
Živko Radišić, former member of the Presidency of Bosnia and Herzegovina
Zlatko Lagumdžija, former Chairman of the Council of Ministers of Bosnia and Herzegovina
Zlatko Topčić, Bosnian writer
Abdulah Nakaš, physician and chief surgeon of Sarajevo's State Hospital for 30 years

Notable faculty

Adil Osmanović, former Minister of Civil Affairs
Alija Behmen, former mayor of Sarajevo and former Prime Minister of Federation of Bosnia and Herzegovina
Benjamina Karić, current mayor of Sarajevo
Bogić Bogićević, former member of the Presidency of Yugoslavia
Dejan Milošević, theoretical physicist
Ejup Ganić, former Prime Minister of the Federation of Bosnia and Herzegovina
Hamdija Pozderac, president of SR Bosnia and Herzegovina from 1971 to 1974
Haris Silajdžić, former member of the Presidency of Bosnia and Herzegovina
Zlatko Lagumdžija, former Chairman of the Council of Ministers of Bosnia and Herzegovina
Zoran G. Jančić, Bosnian pianist
Elmedin Konaković, former Prime Minister of Sarajevo Canton
Haris Pašović, Bosnia and Herzegovina director and founder of East West Theatre Company
Mirko Šarović, former member of the Presidency of Bosnia and Herzegovina 
Nenad Kecmanović, former member of the Presidency of Bosnia and Herzegovina and rector of the University of Sarajevo
Danis Tanović, Oscar-winning director
Zdravko Grebo, founder of the Open Society Foundation of Bosnia and Herzegovina
Senad Hadžifejzović, journalist, news anchor and TV host
Sifet Podžić, Minister of Defence and former Chief of Joint Staff of the Armed Forces of Bosnia and Herzegovina
Sredoje Nović, former Minister of Civil Affairs and first director of the State Investigation and Protection Agency
Sulejman Tihić, former member of the Presidency of Bosnia and Herzegovina 
Tomislav Dretar, writer, critic and philosopher
Predrag Finci, philosopher and essayist

See also
Balkan Universities Network
List of universities in Bosnia and Herzegovina
Education in Bosnia and Herzegovina
List of colleges and universities
List of split up universities

References

External links

 

 
Universities in Bosnia and Herzegovina
Educational institutions established in the 1530s
Educational institutions established in 1949
Universities in Sarajevo
Grad Sarajevo
1949 establishments in Yugoslavia
1537 establishments in the Ottoman Empire